Darrell Ware (1906–1944) was an American screenwriter and film producer. Ware and Karl Tunberg were nominees for the Academy Award for Best Original Screenplay at the 14th Academy Awards for their film Tall, Dark, and Handsome.

Ware wrote and contributed to the writing of several films starring Shirley Temple while he was under contract to 20th Century Fox. Ware joined Paramount Studios in 1942, where he wrote for film stars including Bing Crosby, Alan Ladd, and Paulette Goddard.

As a senior at Northwestern University in 1929, Ware co-wrote the script for and staged the college musical comedy that became "The Waa-Mu Show".

Selected filmography
 Hotel for Women (1939)
 Public Deb No. 1 (1940)

References

External links

1906 births
1944 deaths
American film producers
American male screenwriters
Place of birth missing
20th-century American businesspeople
20th-century American male writers
20th-century American screenwriters
Northwestern University alumni